James Thomas Sheehan (June 3, 1913 – December 2, 2003), nicknamed "Big Jim", was a catcher in Major League Baseball. He played for the New York Giants.

References

External links

1913 births
2003 deaths
Major League Baseball catchers
New York Giants (NL) players
Baseball players from New Haven, Connecticut